Spilosoma jussiaeae is a moth in the family Erebidae. It was described by Felipe Poey in 1832. It is found on Cuba.

Description
Pure white; palpi and fore tibiae streaked with black; tarsi ringed with black; femora orange above; abdomen with dorsal series of black points; diffused orange lateral fasciæ. Forewing with black point at lower angle of cell.

Hab. Cuba (Ruiz), 2 M, 3 F . The wingspan of the male is 32 mm and the female 40 mm.

References

Proceedings of the Entomological Society of Philadelphia v. 5, Memoir (1865)

Moths described in 1832
jussiaeae
Endemic fauna of Cuba